Lengerich is a railway station located in Lengerich, Germany.

History

The station is located on the Wanne-Eickel–Hamburg railway line. The train services are operated by DB Regio NRW and eurobahn.

Train services
The following services currently call at Lengerich:

References

Railway stations in North Rhine-Westphalia